Pseudonesohedyotis is a genus of flowering plants belonging to the family Rubiaceae.

Its native range is Tanzania.

Species:
 Pseudonesohedyotis bremekampii Tennant

References

Rubiaceae
Rubiaceae genera